Mikkolainen is a surname. Notable people with the surname include:

Kalle Mikkolainen (1883–1928), Finnish gymnast
Reijo Mikkolainen (born 1964), Finnish ice hockey player
Veijo Mikkolainen (born 1924), Finnish rower

Finnish-language surnames